María Fux (born 2 January 1922) is an Argentine dancer, choreographer and dance therapist. She developed a dance therapy system, in Argentina, later establishing dance schools in Argentina and Europe, training physiotherapists, occupational therapists, speech therapists, doctors, teachers of dance and of gymnastics, psychotherapists, psychologists, and teachers working with people with disabilities. 

She has been invited to institutions, conferences and seminars to witness their experiences with issues related to deafness, down syndrome, intellectual disabilities, autistic individuals, elderly, and various other disabilities. She turned 100 in January 2022.

Awards
 Diploma, UNESCO (1996)
 Recognition from UN (1999)
 Illustrious citizen of the city (2002)
Gratia Artis Award (2007)
Silver Clover Award, Rotary (2008)
Bicentennial Medal (2010)
National Endowment for the Arts Award (2011)
Rosa Silver Award of Congress (2012)

Selected works
Fux published several books, which have been translated into Italian and Portuguese:

See also 
 Dancing with Maria

References

External links
 

1922 births
Living people
People from Buenos Aires
Argentine female dancers
Argentine choreographers
Dance therapists
Women centenarians
Argentine centenarians